= Asia Network for Sustainable Agriculture and Bioresources =

Nepal-based non-governmental organization

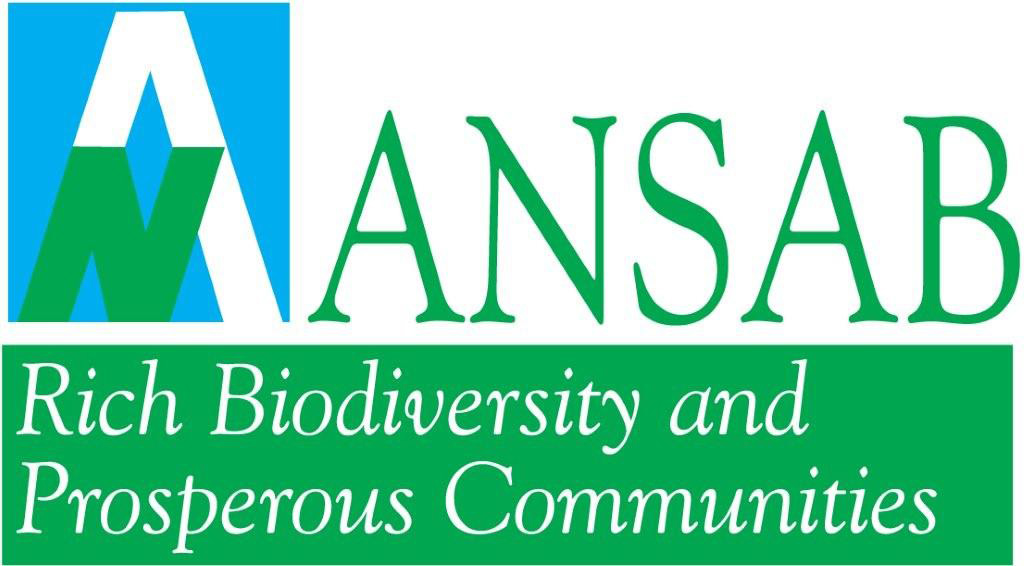
- ANSAB Logo
- Formation: 1992
- Headquarters: Kathmandu, Nepal
- Website: www.ansab.org.np

The Asia Network for Sustainable Agriculture and Bioresources (ANSAB) is a non-governmental organization, headquartered in Kathmandu, Nepal. It was established in 1992. ANSAB is committed to enterprise oriented solutions to biodiversity conservation and sustainable community development.

== Vision ==
ANSAB has a vision of rural South Asia built on rich biodiversity and prosperous communities. This vision includes rich, healthy and productive ecosystems actively managed and sustainably used by formerly poor local communities. It also features adaptive people and resilient ecosystems able to cope with global climate change.

== Mission ==
Generate and implement community-based, enterprise-oriented solutions that conserve biodiversity and improve the livelihoods of the poorest of the poor while bolstering national economic development and addressing climate change.

== History ==
ANSAB was established in 1992 by Appropriate Technology International, now called EnterpriseWorks/VITA, (a NGO based in Washington DC, United States) and the Ministry of Agriculture of Nepal with the goal, at the time, of raising the living standards of small holder farmers in South Asia. Initial financial support helped create small-scale technology development and extension programs in order to generate knowledge and build capacity in agriculture and forestry.

The preliminary projects focused on tissue culture, bio-fertilizer, research and capacity building in Nepal, Sri Lanka, India, Philippines and Indonesia. ANSAB realized that conservation and bioresources had great potential to address the livelihood needs of small farmers and, therefore, expanded its focus to include micro, small and medium size enterprise development and natural resources management.
